Natasha Grillo (born 17 November 1995) is an Italian professional racing cyclist.

See also
 Top Girls Fassa Bortolo

References

External links
 

1995 births
Living people
Italian female cyclists
Sportspeople from the Province of Ferrara
Cyclists from Emilia-Romagna